The Women 's tournament of the Volleyball competition at the 2011 Island Games was held from 26 June–1 July 2011 at the Fairway Sports Complex and Rew Valley Sports Centre.

Participating teams

Format
The 12 teams were split into two groups of six, the first two of each pool advanced to the semifinals while the third, fourth, fifth and sixth team played placement games.

Group stage

Pool A

|}

|}

Pool B

|}

|}

Knockout stage

Bracket

Semifinals

|}

Eleventh place game

|}

Ninth place game

|}

Seventh place game

|}

Fifth place game

|}

Bronze medal game

|}

Gold medal game

|}

References
Results

2011 Island Games